Kabanga is one of a number of towns in Tanzania with this name.  This is the one in Kigoma Region.

Transport 

You can get to Kabanga travelling first to the city of Kigoma by airplane or railway from Dar es Salaam. Then by road, driving  from Kigoma to Kasulu and  more from Kasulu to Kabanga village.

See also 
 Kabanga Nickel Project
 Kabanga, Kagera Region

Populated places in Kigoma Region